"Duden" is a world music song performed by Belgian singer Natacha Atlas. The song was written by Natacha Atlas, Count Dubulah, Hamid ManTu and Attiah Ahlan and produced by Transglobal Underground for the Atlas' debut album Diaspora (1995). It was released as a promotional single in 1995.

Formats and track listings
These are the formats and track listings of major single releases of "Duden".

CD single
(ATLAS #1 CD)
"Duden" (Spooky's Day Trip to Sousse) – 6:52
"Duden" (The Indian Jungle Book mix) – 6:10
"Duden" – 6:41

References

External links
Official website
NatachaAtlas.net – authorized fan site

1995 singles
Electronic songs
Natacha Atlas songs
1995 songs
Songs written by Natacha Atlas